Gumbo Unplugged is the third live album and fifth overall by American singer-songwriter PJ Morton. It was released on March 9, 2018, by Morton Records, as the follow-up to his fourth studio album Gumbo (2017). The album is entirely live recorded and features guest appearances by Keyon Harrold, BJ the Chicago Kid, Lecrae, and R&B singer Anthony Hamilton's back-up group, The HamilTones.
String arrangements by Matt Jones with the participation of violinist Scott Tixier

Gumbo Unplugged earned Morton three Grammy nominations for Best R&B Album, Best R&B Performance and Best Traditional R&B Performance at the 61st Annual Grammy Awards.

Track listing

References

2018 live albums
PJ Morton albums